Jativa castanealis is a species of moth of the family Crambidae. It is the only species in its genus, which is found in North America, where it has been recorded from Arizona, New Mexico and Texas.

Adults have been recorded on wing from April to May and from July to October.

References

Eurrhypini
Crambidae genera
Taxa named by Eugene G. Munroe
Monotypic moth genera